The 2017 Open Bogotá was a professional tennis tournament played on clay courts. It was the twelfth edition of the tournament which was part of the 2017 ATP Challenger Tour. It took place in Bogotá, Colombia between 5 and 10 September 2017.

Singles main-draw entrants

Seeds

 1 Rankings are as of 28 August 2017.

Other entrants
The following players received wildcards into the singles main draw:
  Felipe Mantilla
  Alejandro Mendoza
  Cristian Rodríguez
  Carlos Salamanca

The following players received entry from the qualifying draw:
  Mauricio Echazú
  Gonzalo Escobar 
  Pedro Sakamoto
  Juan Pablo Varillas

The following player received entry as a lucky loser:
  Juan Sebastián Gómez

Champions

Singles

 Marcelo Arévalo def.  Daniel Elahi Galán 7–5, 6–4.

Doubles

 Marcelo Arévalo /  Miguel Ángel Reyes-Varela def.  Nikola Mektić /  Franko Škugor 6–3, 3–6, [10–6].

References

Open Bogota
Seguros Bolívar Open Bogotá
2017 in Colombian tennis